The Evergreen State-class ferries were built by the Puget Sound Dredge and Bridge Company for Washington State Ferries beginning in 1953.  This class was the first built after the state agency was created in 1951.  Each Evergreen State-class ferry originally carried 100 cars and 1000 passengers.

The Evergreen State-class ferries include:

  (Retired)
  (Retired)

External links 

Washington State Ferries vessel classes
Ferry classes